Zvekovica   is a village in southern Croatia, in the municipality of Konavle within Dubrovnik-Neretva County. It is connected by the D8 state road.

References

Populated places in Dubrovnik-Neretva County
Konavle